Vicente Rodríguez Royán (born July 20, 1954) is a retired boxer from Spain, who represented his native country at the 1976 Summer Olympics. There he was stopped (lost on points, 2:3) in the third round of the flyweight division (– 51 kg) division by North Korea's Jong Jo-Ung.

References
 Spanish Olympic Committee

1954 births
Living people
Flyweight boxers
Boxers at the 1976 Summer Olympics
Olympic boxers of Spain
Spanish male boxers
Place of birth missing (living people)
20th-century Spanish people